Mertensia longiflora is a species of flowering plant in the borage family known by the common names small bluebells and long bluebells.

Distribution
It is native to western North America from British Columbia to California to Montana, where it grows in several types of habitat.

Description
It is a perennial herb growing from branched and tuberous roots in the form of a caudex. There are a few oval to lance-shaped leaves.

The inflorescence is a dense, often crowded cluster of hanging tubular flowers which are fused at the base and expand into lobed and bell-like mouths. They are generally bright blue, but may be lavender to pinkish to nearly white, and measure up to 2.5 cm long.

References

External links
Jepson Manual Treatment
Photo gallery

longiflora
Flora of the Northwestern United States
Flora of California
Flora of British Columbia
Flora of the Great Basin
Flora of Idaho
Flora of Montana
Flora of Oregon
Flora without expected TNC conservation status